The 1846 United States elections occurred in the middle of Democratic President James Polk's term, during the Second Party System. The election took place during the Mexican–American War. Members of the 30th United States Congress were chosen in this election. Wisconsin joined the union during the 30th Congress. Democrats kept control of the Senate, but lost control of the House.

In the House, the Whigs won major gains, turning a dominant Democratic majority into a narrow Whig majority.

In the Senate, Democrats picked up a moderate number of seats, building on their majority.

See also
 1846–47 United States House of Representatives elections
 1846–47 United States Senate elections

References

1846 elections in the United States
1846
United States midterm elections
November 1846 events